A list of windmills in Manche, France.

External links
French windmills website

Windmills in France
Manche
Buildings and structures in Manche